Ascidicolidae is a family of copepods belonging to the order Cyclopoida.

Genera:
 Aplopodus Hesse, 1869
 Ascidicola Thorell, 1859
 Ceratrichodes Hesse, 1866
 Hypnoticus Wilson, 1924
 Lygephile Hesse, 1865
 Lygephilus Hesse, 1865
 Narcodina Wilson, 1924
 Podolabis Hesse, 1864
 Polyoon Hesse, 1878
 Styelicola Lützen, 1968

References

Copepods